Korneli Kekelidze (April 30, 1879 – June 7, 1962) was a Soviet and Georgian philologist, scholar of Georgian literature, and one of the founding fathers of the Tbilisi State University where he chaired the Department of the History of Old Georgian Literature from 1918 until his death.

Kekelidze left a diverse literary and scholarly legacy that laid foundation for critical study of the Georgian literature. He discovered, studied and published several pieces of Old Georgian literature. His most influential work A History of Old Georgian Literature (ძველი ქართული ლიტერატურის ისტორია) went through four editions between 1923 and 1960. The magnitude of Kekelidze’s accomplishments was recognized by the naming of the Georgian Institute of Manuscripts in Tbilisi in his honor.

Kekelidze became a member of the Georgian National Academy of Sciences in 1941.

References 

1879 births
1962 deaths
19th-century historians from Georgia (country)
20th-century historians from Georgia (country)
People from Kutais Governorate
Philologists from Georgia (country)
Members of the Georgian National Academy of Sciences
Academic staff of Tbilisi State University
Honoured Scientists of Georgia (country)
Recipients of the Order of Lenin
Recipients of the Order of the Red Banner of Labour